Voice Quality Symbols (VoQS) are a set of phonetic symbols used to transcribe disordered speech for what in speech pathology is known as "voice quality". This phrase is usually synonymous with phonation in phonetics, but in speech pathology encompasses secondary articulation as well.

VoQS symbols are normally combined with curly braces that span a section of speech, just as with prosody notation in the extended IPA. The symbols may be modified with a digit to convey relative degree of the quality. For example,  is used for harsh voice, and } indicates that the intervening speech is very harsh.  indicates a lowered larynx. Thus, } indicates that the intervening speech is less harsh with a lowered larynx.

VoQS use mostly IPA or extended IPA diacritics on capital letters for the element being modified: V for 'voice'/articulation, L for 'larynx', and J for 'jaw'. Degree is marked 1 for slight, 2 for moderate, and 3 for extreme.

Symbols
The following combinations of letters and diacritics are used. They indicate an airstream mechanism, phonation or secondary articulation across a stretch of speech. For example, 'palatalized voice' indicates palatalization of all segments of speech spanned by the braces.

Several of these symbols may be profitably used as part of single speech sounds, in addition to indicating voice qualities across spans of speech. For example,  is blowing a raspberry, while  indictes a string of speech with a Donald Duck quality.  is the l* sound in Damin while  is a string of ingressive speech.

Airstream mechanisms
The airstream mechanism is the process for generating the flow of air required for speech.

} buccal speech (symbol is iconic for the pockets of air in the cheeks)
} œsophageal speech (symbol derives from the letter œ of ''œsophagus)
} tracheo-œsophageal speech (symbol attempts to capture iconically the dual nature of the airstream)
} pulmonic ingressive speech

Phonation types
The four primary phonation types, other than voiceless, each receive a distinct letter:
} modal voice 
} falsetto
} whisper (Typically only the normally modally voiced segments are whispery, while the voiceless segments remain voiceless. Note that this "whisper" is distinct from the "whispery voice" below.)
} creak

Modifications are made with diacritics. The terms "whispery voice" and "breathy voice" follow Catford (1977) and differ from the vocabulary of the IPA, with VoQS "whispery voice" being equivalent to IPA "breathy voice" / "murmur". The notations } and } are therefore often confused, and } should perhaps be used for VoQS "whispery voice" with e.g. } for VoQS "breathy voice".

} whispery voice (murmur; the breathy voice of the IPA)
} creaky voice
} breathy voice
} whispery creak
} slack/lax voice
} harsh voice (without ventricular vibration; this may differ from the use of the word "harsh" cross-linguistically, which may be the same as "ventricular", next)
} ventricular phonation
} diplophonia (simultaneous ventricular and glottal vibration; see also vocal-fold cyst)
} whispery ventricular phonation
} (html ) aryepiglottic phonation
} pressed phonation/tight voice (made by pressing together the arytenoid cartilages so that only the anterior ligamental vocal folds vibrate; the opposite of whisper, where the vibration is posterior)
} tight whisper
} spasmodic dysphonia
} electrolaryngeal phonation (approximates symbol for electricity)
} raised larynx
} lowered larynx
} faucalized voice (iconic of narrowing of faucal pillars)
} zero airstream

Secondary articulation
These settings involve secondary articulation, usually in addition to any articulation that would be expected for non-pathological speech. 
They are called voices because they affect the sound quality of the utterance (that is, the individual's human voice), though this usage contradicts the IPA use of the word "voice" for voicing. For illustration here, diacritics are combined with the letter 'V' for modal voice, as that is the default assumption. (They could also be combined with F, W, C, etc.)

} labialized (open rounded; that is)
} labialized (close rounded)
} spread-lip 
} labio-dentalized
} linguo-apicalized
} linguo-laminalized
} retroflex
} dentalized (diacritic iconic for a tooth)
} alveolarized (diacritic iconic for the alveolar ridge)
} palatoalveolarized
} palatalized
} velarized
} uvularized (self-evident extension of IPA usage)
} pharyngealized 
} laryngo-pharyngealized 
} nasalized
} denasalized
} open jaw (that is, more than the norm)
} close jaw (more than the norm)
} right-offset jaw 
} left-offset jaw 
} protruded jaw 
} protruded tongue (protrusion of the tip or blade of the tongue for extended periods)

Compound notation
Combinations of symbols are also used, such as } for nasal whispery voice, } for whispery creaky falsetto, or } for ventricular phonation with nasal lisp. If the number of diacritics on a letter becomes excessive, the notation may be broken up. For example, } may be replaced with }.

See also
Extensions to the International Phonetic Alphabet
International Phonetic Alphabet

References

Phonetic alphabets